Will Vesper (11 October 1882 in Barmen, Germany – 14 March 1962 in Gut Triangel bei Gifhorn) was a German author and literary critic.

Life and work 
Born into a Protestant farmer family, he read History and Germanic philology (Germanistik) in Munich. From 1906 he was active as literary adviser and translator at the C.H. Beck publishing house. In 1913-1914 he was in Florence, Italy. He rose to early fame as the editor of several anthologies of German poetry of a ‘spiritual’ kind, including Der deutsche Psalter and two volumes of Die Ernte aus acht Jahrhunderten deutscher Lyrik, and for his retelling of the Tristan and Isolde and Parzifal legends, all of which sold in tens of thousands before 1914.   Vesper took part in World War I from 1915 to 1918, first as an infantryman, and towards the end of the war as scientific or intelligence assistant in the military staff.

After a two-year period as manager of the cultural section of the Deutsche Allgemeine Zeitung from 1918 to 1920, Vesper was employed from 1923 until 1943 as editor of the periodical Die schöne Literatur (Beautiful Literature) (later under the title Die Neue Literatur (New Literature)), which was to become the leading national socialist literature magazine. At the same time he published his own novels, stories and poems. His works mainly dealt with German history, and above all with proto-Germanic times. In these he displayed a decidedly nationalistic perception, which together with his glorification and exalting of the love of the native soil, of motherhood and war, made it inevitable that he would become a representative of Nazi ideology. His best-known work Das harte Geschlecht, about the Christian conversion of Iceland, appeared in 1931 and in May 1933 was praised in the Völkischer Beobachter as a 'thoroughly bloodthirsty Northland novel.'

In 1931 Vesper, whom Thomas Mann described asalready one of the worst of the nationalist buffoons, joined the NSDAP. After the exclusion of the disapproved authors from the Poetry department of the Academy of Prussian Arts (like Thomas Mann, Leonhard Frank, Alfred Döblin and others), in around 1933 Vesper installed among others Hans Friedrich Blunck, Hans Carossa and Hans Grimm in the Poets Academy. In the public book-burning in May 1933 in Dresden, Vesper gave the ceremonial speech. He was one of the 88 authors who in October 1933 signed the Vow of the Loyal Followers (Gelöbnis treuester Gefolgschaft) for Adolf Hitler published in the Vossische Zeitung and Frankfurter Zeitung.

Already, at the beginning of the thirties, Vesper was becoming known as an author of the Bertelsmann editions.

In his literary Journal Die Neue Literatur Vesper carried out a kind of private censorship or revisionism, regularly embarking upon defamatory campaigns against authors and publishers who did not agree with his personal views. When he also did not hold back from attacking the State Directives in regard to writing, he lost the advantage of his position, so that in 1936 he withdrew from his duties to the estate of his wife Rose (Rimpau) Vesper at Triangel bei Gifhorn. Here he occupied himself as a farmer, but continued to issue his literary newsletters until the year 1943.

After the war Vesper was an editor in the Bertelsmann-Verlag and was active in right-wing circles through readings and Writers' Congresses for Hans Grimm in Lippoldsberg, also where he worked. He died in Gut Triangel on 14 March 1962.

Will Vesper's son, the author Bernward Vesper (1938-1971), also became well known when his autobiographic novel Die Reise (Journey, or, Trip) was posthumously published in 1977. As a student of German studies and sociology, he had been the partner of Gudrun Ensslin, who later became founder of the Red Army Faction. Die Reise is considered an important document of the spirit of the German student movement and German society of the 1960s.

Writings 
Novels, Stories, Fables
Der Segen, 1905
Tristan und Isolde (Nacherzählung), 1911
Parzifal (Nacherzählung), 1911
Martin Luthers Jugendjahre, 1918
Der Balte, 1919
Annemarie, 1920
Traumgewalten, 1920
Gute Geister, 1921
Die Nibelungensage (Nacherzählung), 1921
Daniel Defoe. Leben und Abenteuer des Robinson Crusoe (Bearbeitung), 1922
Die Gudrunsage (Nacherzählung), 1922
Fröhliche Märchen (Neuerzählung), 1922
Porzellan, 1922
Die Wanderung des Herrn Ulrich von Hutten, 1922
Die ewige Wiederkehr, 1922
Der arme Konrad, 1924
Der Pfeifer von Niclashausen, 1924 (Erzählung über den fränkischen Prediger Hans Böhm)
Der Bundschuh zu Lehen, 1925
Jonathan Swift: Lemuel Gullivers vier Reisen (Nacherzählung), 1927
Der Heilige und der Papst, 1928
Die Historie von Reinecke dem Fuchs (Nacherzählung), 1928
Das Mutterbüchlein, 1928
Tiermärchen aus aller Welt (Nacherzählung), 1928
Das harte Geschlecht, 1931
Sam in Schnabelweide, 1931
Drei Erzählungen, 1933
Ein Tag aus dem Leben Goethes, 1933
Der entfesselte Säugling, 1935
Geschichten von Liebe, Traum und Tod, 1937
Kämpfer Gottes, 1938
Im Flug nach Spanien, 1943
Der unzufriedene Igel, 1943
Seltsame Flöte, 1958
Zauber der Heide, 1960
Letzte Ernte, 1962

Dramas, Farces
Spiele der Liebe, 1913
Die Liebesmesse, 1913
Wer? Wen?, 1927
Eine deutsche Feier, 1936

Poems
Die Liebesmesse und andere Gedichte, 1913
Vom großen Krieg 1914, 1915
Der blühende Baum, 1916
Briefe zweier Liebender, 1916
Schön ist der Sommer, 1918
Das Buch vom lieben Weihnachtsmann, 1920
Mutter und Kind, 1920
Des Wiesenmännchen Brautfahrt, 1920
Inschriften und Gedichte, 1928
Kranz des Lebens. Gesamtausgabe meiner Gedichte, 1934
Rufe in die Zeit. Sprüche und Gedichte, 1937
Das Neue Reich, 1939
Bild des Führers, 1942
Dennoch!, 1944
Kleiner Kranz des Lebens. Auswahl, 1960

Essays and Editions
Friedrich Hölderlin: Hyperion (Nachwort), 1921
Lob der Armut, 1921
Die Jugendbibel (Bearbeitung), 1927
Das Recht der Lebenden, 1927
In den Bergen, auf dem Wasser (Einführung), 1928
Die Weltenuhr, 1932
(Ed.) Die Ernte aus acht Jahrhunderten deutsche Lyrik, 1906 (2 vols)
(Ed.) Der deutsche Psalter – ein Jahrtausend geistlicher Dichtung, 1914
(Ed.) Deutsche Lyrik von Heute: Ernte der Gegenwart und Ernte der Zeit, 1940

Notes

Sources 

Gisela Berglund, Der Kampf um den Leser im Dritten Reich. Die Literaturpolitik der "Neuen Literatur" (Will Vesper) und der "Nationalsozialistischen Monatshefte" (The struggle surrounding the reader in the Third Reich) (Worms, Heintz 1980). (= Deutsches Exil 1933–45; 11) 
Uwe Day, Hohepriester des Hitlerkults und literarischer Inquisitor. Über Will Vesper (High-Priests of the Hitler-cult and the literary Inquisitor - about Will Vesper). In: Griffel. Hannover. 9. (2000), p. 61-73.
Frederick Alfred Lubich, Bernward Vespers "Die Reise". Von der Hitler-Jugend zur RAF. Identitätssuche unter dem Fluch des Faschismus (Bernward Vesper's The Journey. From the Hitler-youth to the RAF. The search for identity under the curse of Fascism.) In: German Studies Review. Tempe, Ariz. 10 (1987), p. 69-94.
Wilhelm Pleyer, Hans Grimm, E. G. Kolbenheyer, Will Vesper. Gedenkrede (on 15 July 1962 on the occasion of the Lippoldsberg Poets'-days). (Munich and elsewhere, Bogen-Verlag 1962).
Alexander Reck (Ed.), Briefwechsel Paul Ernst - Will Vesper 1919-1933 (Letters between). Einführung - Edition - Kommentar. (Würzburg: Königshausen und Neumann, 2003). 
Bernward Vesper, Die Reise (Trip). (Novel-essay). (Frankfurt am Main: März bei Zweitausendeins 1977).
Böckelmann/Fischler, Bertelsmann. Hinter der Fassade des Medienimperiums (Betelsmann: Behind the facade of the Media empire). (Frankfurt am Main 2004, Eichborn) . (pp 66, 84f., 92, 110.)
This article translated and abridged from German Wikipedia 2007
 Literature of and about Will Vesper in the Catalogue of the German National Library

External links 
 
 

1882 births
1962 deaths
Writers from Wuppertal
German male writers
German Army personnel of World War I
Nazi Party members